Margarette May Macaulay (born 20th century) is the Jamaican Commissioner of the Inter-American Commission on Human Rights (OAS).

Life
Macaulay was born in West Africa and is of Czech-German, Dominican-French-Creole, and Sierra Leone heritage. She passed her law degree at the University of London, Holborn College. She then moved with her husband and young daughter, Berette, from Sierra Leone to Jamaica.

Macaulay has worked as a professional and academic in the area of human rights, particularly in the field of the rights of children and women. She is a recognized expert in the fight against gender violence. She has also worked for the abolition of the death penalty in the Caribbean region, environmental rights and for the land rights of indigenous peoples.

She was judge of the Inter-American Court of Human Rights between 2007 and 2012 where she contributed to the formulation of the Rules of Procedure of the Court.

Macauley was elected as a member of the IACHR by the OAS General Assembly in 2015 to replace Francisco Eguiguren of Peru. She was the Rapporteur for Antigua and Barbuda, Bahamas, Dominica, the United States, El Salvador and Saint Kitts and Nevis. She was the Rapporteur on Rights of Women and Rapporteur on the Rights of People of African Descent and against Racial Discrimination.

Macaulay was elected commissioner of the Inter-American Commission on Human Rights (IACHR) by the OAS General Assembly for a period of four years, from January 1, 2016, to December 31, 2019. She was the President of the IACHR.

References

20th-century births
Living people
Year of birth missing (living people)
Sierra Leonean emigrants
Sierra Leone Creole people
21st-century Jamaican judges
Organization of American States people
Inter-American Commission on Human Rights commissioners